Luzzasco Luzzaschi (c. 1545 – 10 September 1607) was an Italian composer, organist, and teacher of the late Renaissance.  He was born and died in Ferrara, and despite evidence of travels to Rome  it is assumed that Luzzaschi spent the majority of his life in his native city. He was a skilled representative of the late Italian madrigal style, along with Palestrina, Wert, Monte, Lassus, Marenzio, Gesualdo and others.

Biography
As a pupil of Cipriano de Rore, Luzzaschi developed his craft and eventually came to be an influential pedagogue himself. Anthony Newcomb writes:

In 1564, Luzzaschi was appointed as principal organist to the d'Este court.  His facility as a keyboard player must have been paramount, for his competence on Nicola Vicentino's microtonal archicembalo was actively documented throughout his career.

Luzzaschi is widely remembered due to his association with the famous Concerto delle donne, a private female vocal ensemble founded by Alfonso II, Duke of Ferrara.  In addition to his duties as court organist, as director for the ensemble he composed expert madrigals that required virtuosic vocal skill and advanced musicianship.  Expressing a highly ornamented soprano line, his famous publication, Madrigali...per cantare, et sonare, a uno, e doi, e tre soprani of 1601 contained repertory performed by this expert troupe.

Works
Luzzaschi's surviving canon is limited to: seven books (1571 through 1604) of madrigals for five voices; the 1601 Madrigali per cantare et sonare a 1-3 soprani; a collection of five-part motets; and four keyboard works.  While reference to three books of four-voice ricercars by Luzzaschi indicates that he was actively composing instrumental work, the books themselves appear to be lost.

 Il primo libro de madrigali a cinque voci (1571)

Sources
Gustave Reese, Music in the Renaissance.  New York, W.W. Norton & Co., 1954.  
The Concise Edition of Baker's Biographical Dictionary of Musicians, 8th ed.  Revised by Nicolas Slonimsky.  New York, Schirmer Books, 1993.

References

External links

Italian classical composers
Italian classical organists
Male classical organists
Renaissance composers
1540s births
1607 deaths
16th-century Italian composers
Madrigal composers
Italian male classical composers
Musicians from Ferrara
16th-century classical composers